Le Mans was an indie rock band from the Basque country, Spain, in existence between 1993 and 1998. Having previously toured and released records under the name Aventuras de Kirlian, the group took a new direction as they hired a new member, Gorka Ochoa, to play the drums.

Together with La Buena Vida it was one of the main exponents of "Donosti Sound", a style similar to twee pop.

In 2000 the Argentine band Suárez recorded the EP 29:09:00, consisting of 5 cover versions of Le Mans songs.

Line-up
 Jone Gabarain - vocals
 Teresa Iturrioz - bass
 Ibon Errazkin - guitar
 Peru Izeta - guitar
 Gorka Ochoa - drums

Discography

Albums
 Le Mans (Elefant, 1993)
 Entresemana (Elefant, 1994)
 Zerbina (Elefant, 1995)
 Saudade (Elefant, 1996)
 Aquí vivía yo (Elefant, 1998)
 "Catástrofe nº17" (Elefant, 2003)

References

Spanish indie rock groups
Musical groups established in 1993
Musical groups disestablished in 1998
1993 establishments in Spain